Talkin' & Walkin' is an album by pianist Kenny Drew recorded in 1955 and originally released on the Jazz:West label. The album was subsequently rereleased on Pacific Jazz and on CD on Blue Note with three additional live tracks recorded around the same time.

Reception
The Allmusic review states "Excellent modern mainstream music of the mid-'50s".

Track listing
All compositions by Kenny Drew except as indicated
 "Talkin' Walkin'" - 6:19    
 "In the Prescribed Manner" - 5:06    
 "Prelude to a Kiss" (Duke Ellington, Irving Mills, Mack Gordon) - 5:30    
 "Wee-Dot" (J. J. Johnson, Leo Parker) - 5:45    
 "Hidden Channel" - 4:50    
 "Deadline" - 3:20    
 "I'm Old Fashioned" (Jerome Kern, Johnny Mercer) - 4:57    
 "Minor Blues (Blues in a Cardboard Box)" - 5:42    
 "Walkin' Talkin'" - 5:42  
 "It's a Only a Paper Moon" (Harold Arlen, Billy Rose, E.Y. Harburg) - 6:56 Bonus track on CD reissue   
 "Leroy's Blues" - 5:55 Bonus track on CD reissue      
 "Contour" - 7:18 Bonus track on CD reissue 
Recorded at the Forum Theatre in Los Angeles on November 18, 1955 (tracks 10-12) and at Capitol Studios in Los Angeles in December 1955 (tracks 1-9)

Personnel
Kenny Drew - piano
Jack Sheldon - trumpet (tracks 10-12)
Joe Maini - alto saxophone, tenor saxophone
Leroy Vinnegar - bass
Lawrence Marable - drums

References

Kenny Drew albums
1956 albums
Blue Note Records albums

Albums recorded at Capitol Studios